Flemming Meyer (born 13 December 1951) is a German-Danish politician from the South Schleswig Voters' Association (SSW) and was a member of the Landtag of Schleswig-Holstein from 2009 to 2020.

Early life 
Meyer was born in Sønderborg, Denmark.

Political career 
In 2020 he left the state parliament and was replaced by Christian Dirschauer.

References 

Living people
1951 births

Danish minority of Southern Schleswig
21st-century German politicians
South Schleswig Voters' Association politicians
Members of the Landtag of Schleswig-Holstein
People from Sønderborg